Treasure of the Sea is a 1918 American silent drama film directed by Frank Reicher and starring Edith Storey, Lew Cody, and Lewis Willoughby. It was released on April 22, 1918.

Cast list
 Edith Storey as Margaret Elkins
 Lew Cody as Jim Hardwick
 Lewis Willoughby as Henry Ames
 Josef Swickard as Thomas Elkins
 William De Vaull as Harris
 Tote Du Crow as Manuel

References

External links 
 
 
 

Metro Pictures films
Films directed by Frank Reicher
American silent feature films
American black-and-white films
Silent American drama films
1918 drama films
1918 films
1910s English-language films
1910s American films